Lejeuneaceae is the largest family of liverworts. Most of its members are epiphytes found in the tropics, while others can be found in temperate regions.

The main characteristics of the family are that:
The leaves are incubous.
Amphigastrium is usually present, sometimes reduced.
Leaves are divided into lobe and lobule.
Archaegonium in a perianth.

Some large genera of the family are Lejeunea, Ceratolejeunea (around 84 species,) and Cheilolejeunea (around 275 species,).

Taxonomy
The Lejeuneaceae are the largest family of liverworts with more than 1600 species, which equates to roughly 20% to 25% of all liverworts. These species are assigned to 95 genera.

List of genera

 Acanthocoleus
 Acantholejeunea
 Acrolejeunea
 Amphilejeunea
 Anoplolejeunea
 Aphanolejeunea
 Aphanotropis
 Archilejeunea
 Aureolejeunea
 Austrolejeunea
 Blepharolejeunea
 Brachiolejeunea
 Bromeliophila
 Bryopteris
 Calatholejeunea
 Capillolejeunea
 Caudalejeunea
 Cephalantholejeunea
 Cephalolejeunea
 Ceratolejeunea
 Cheilolejeunea
 Cladolejeunea
 Cololejeunea
 Colura
 Crossotolejeunea
 Cyclolejeunea
 Cyrtolejeunea
 Cystolejeunea
 Dactylolejeunea
 Dactylophorella
 Dendrolejeunea
 Dicladolejeunea
 Dicranolejeunea
 Diplasiolejeunea
 Drepanolejeunea
 Echinocolea
 Echinolejeunea
 Evansiolejeunea
 Frullanoides
 Fulfordianthus
 Haplolejeunea
 Harpalejeunea
 Hattoriolejeunea
 Kymatolejeunea
 Leiolejeunea
 Lejeunea
 Lepidolejeunea
 Leptolejeunea
 Leucolejeunea
 Lindigianthus
 Lopholejeunea
 Luteolejeunea
 Macrocolura
 Macrolejeunea
 Marchesinia
 Mastigolejeunea
 Metalejeunea
 Metzgeriopsis
 Microlejeunea
 Myriocolea
 Myriocoleopsis
 Nephelolejeunea
 Neurolejeunea
 Nipponolejeunea
 Odontolejeunea
 Omphalanthus
 Oryzolejeunea
 Otolejeunea
 Phaeolejeunea
 Physantholejeunea
 Pictolejeunea
 Pluvianthus
 Potamolejeunea
 Prionolejeunea
 Ptychanthus
 Pycnolejeunea
 Rectolejeunea
 Rhaphidolejeunea
 Schiffneriolejeunea
 Schusterolejeunea
 Siphonolejeunea
 Sphaerolejeunea
 Spruceanthus
 Stenolejeunea
 Stictolejeunea
 Symbiezidium
 Taxilejeunea
 Thysananthus
 Trachylejeunea
 Trocholejeunea
 Tuyamaella
 Tuzibeanthus
 Verdoornianthus
 Vitalianthus
 Yanoella

References

 
Liverwort families